The Journal of Infection in Developing Countries is a monthly peer-reviewed open-access medical journal that covers research on infectious diseases, especially in developing countrie. Researchers from these countries are offered mentoring by the editorial board, a special committee, and staff. The journal is abstracted and indexed by Scopus and Clarivate and the journal has a 2021 impact factor of 2.512 according to the Journal Citation Reports. The editor-in-chief is Salvatore Rubino (University of Sassari).

References

External links
 

Open access journals
Publications established in 2006
Microbiology journals
Monthly journals